Michael Aaron Nielsen (born January 4, 1974) is a quantum physicist, science writer, and computer programming researcher living in San Francisco.

Work
In 1998, Nielsen received his PhD in physics from the University of New Mexico. In 2004, he was recognized as Australia's "youngest academic" and was awarded a Federation Fellowship at the University of Queensland. During this fellowship, he worked at the Los Alamos National Laboratory, Caltech, at the Perimeter Institute for Theoretical Physics. 

Alongside Isaac Chuang, Nielsen co-authored a popular textbook on quantum computing, which has been cited more than 36,000 times as of December 2019.

In 2007, Nielsen shifted his focus from quantum information and computation to “the development of new tools for scientific collaboration and publication”, including the Polymath project with Timothy Gowers, which aims to facilitate "massively collaborative mathematics." Besides writing books and essays, he has also given talks about open science. He was a member of the Working Group on Open Data in Science at the Open Knowledge Foundation.

In 2015 Nielsen published the online textbook Neural Networks and Deep Learning, and joined the Recurse Center as a Research Fellow. He has also been a Research Fellow at Y Combinator Research since 2017.

In 2019, Nielsen collaborated with Andy Matuschak to develop Quantum Computing for the Very Curious, a series of interactive essays explaining quantum computing and quantum mechanics. With Patrick Collison, he researched whether scientific progress is slowing down.

Nielsen resides in San Francisco.

Bibliography
 
  This book is based on themes that are also covered in his essay on the Future of Science.
 
  (Review of Information: The New Language of Science (2003) by Hans Christian von Baeyer).

References

External links 
Michael Nielsen's account on Twitter
Personal website of Nielsen

1974 births
Living people
Science bloggers
Open content activists
Theoretical physicists
Australian textbook writers
Quantum information scientists
California Institute of Technology fellows
Fulbright alumni